London Buses route 83 is a Transport for London contracted bus route in London, England. Running between Golders Green and Alperton stations, it is operated by Metroline.

History
Twenty new Northern Counties Palatine bodied Volvo Olympians bought by First London for the route in 1999, were among the last non-low-floor buses bought for use in London.

In 2015/16 route 83 was the sixth-busiest TfL bus route with 12.6 million passengers.

From 10 September 2016, the daytime service was withdrawn between Alperton Station and Ealing Hospital and replaced by route 483. The night service was renumbered N83 and continues to run from Golders Green to Ealing Hospital.

On 15 September 2020, it got Wright Eclipse Gemini 3 buses from route 4.

Current route
Route 83 operates via these primary locations:
Golders Green station bus station  
Hendon The Bell
Hendon Central station 
Hendon Station 
West Hendon Broadway
Kingsbury Green
Wembley Park station 
Wembley Stadium station 
Wembley Central station   
Alperton station

References

External links

Timetable

Bus routes in London
Transport in the London Borough of Barnet
Transport in the London Borough of Brent
Transport in the London Borough of Ealing